Dobromir may refer to:

 Dobromir (given name)
 Dobromir, Constanța, commune in Romania
 Dobromir, Bulgaria, village in Bulgaria
 Dobromir (Kruševac), a village in Serbia